The men's elimination race competition at the 2021 UEC European Track Championships was held on 5 October 2021.

Results

References

Men's elimination race
European Track Championships – Men's elimination race